Carlyle Township may refer to the following townships in the United States:

 Carlyle Township, Clinton County, Illinois
 Carlyle Township, Allen County, Kansas